Redingeria is a genus of lichenized fungi in the family Graphidaceae. It was circumscribed in 2006 by Andreas Frisch, with Redingeria leiostoma assigned as the type species. The genus name honours Karl Martin Redinger (1907–1940), an Austrian botanist.

Species
As accepted by Species Fungorum:
Redingeria deightonii 
Redingeria desseiniana  – Democratic Republic of the Congo
Redingeria glaucoglyphica 
Redingeria glyphica 
Redingeria krempelhuberi 
Redingeria leiostoma 
Redingeria microspora 
Redingeria vulcani

References

Graphidaceae
Lichen genera
Ostropales genera
Taxa described in 2006